The 1965 Essex County Council election took place on 25 March 1965 to elect members of Essex County Council in England.

Summary

|}

Division results

Results from 4 divisions are missing from the source document and are therefore not listed here.

Bardfield

Basildon (Billericay)

Basildon (Central)

Basildon (Fryerns)

Basildon (Laindon)

Basildon (Langdon Hills)

Basildon (Pitsea)

Basildon (Ramsden)

Basildon (Wickford)

Benfleet (East)

Benfleet (West)

Braintree & Bocking

Brentwood (Central)

Brentwood (Hutton)

Brentwood (North)

Brentwood (South)

Brightlingsea

Broomfield

Canvey Island

Chelmsford (East)

Chelmsford (North)

Chelmsford (South)

Chelmsford (West)

Chigwell (Buckhurst Hill)

Chigwell (Chigwell)

Chigwell (Loughton North)

Chigwell (Loughton South)

Clacton (North East)

Clacton (South West)

Coggeshall

Colchester (Central)

Colchester (East)

Colchester (North)

Colchester (South)

Colchester (West)

Danbury

Dedham & Stanway

Dunmow

Epping

Epping Upland

Frinton & Walton

Great Baddow

Halstead

Harlow (Harlow & Mark Hall)

Harlow (Netteswell & Little Parndon)

Harlow (Potter Street & Brays Grove)

Harlow (Town Centre & Great Parndon)

Harlow (Tye Green & Latton Bush)

Harwich

Hedingham

Hockley & Rawreth

Maldon

Mersea

Ongar

Southminster

Stansted

Stock

Tendring

Thaxted

Theydon

Thurrock (Chadwell)

Thurrock (Grays Thurrock)

Thurrock (Little Thurrock)

Thurrock (Orsett & Stifford)

Thurrock (South Ockendon)

Thurrock (Stanford-le-Hope & Corringham)

Thurrock (Tilbury)

Thurrock (West Thurrock & Aveley)

Tollesbury

Waltham Abbey

Witham

Wivenhoe

Writtle

References

Essex
Essex County Council elections
1960s in Essex